Antalya is one of the Mediterranean's, and the world's, leading tourism destinations, the city being home to an array of famous attractions. It attracts 30% of foreign tourists visiting Turkey.

Tourist attractions 
 Aksu
 Alanya
 Beydağları
 Demre
 Elmalı
 Karpuzkaldıran
 Kaş
 Kemer
 Konyaaltı
 Lara
 Manavgat
 Saklikent
 Serik

See also

References

External links 
 Antalya Culture and Tourism Directorate 
 Antalya Metropolitan Municipality - Tourism 
 Antalya Airport Transport - Tourism